Jayant Bhalchandra Udgaonkar (born 1960) is an Indian biochemist, molecular biologist, academic and the director of the Indian Institute of Science Education and Research, Pune. He was previously a senior professor at the National Centre for Biological Sciences. A J. C. Bose National Fellow, he is known for his studies on protein folding. He is an elected fellow of the Indian Academy of Sciences, Indian National Science Academy and The World Academy of Sciences. The Council of Scientific and Industrial Research, the apex agency of the Government of India for scientific research, awarded him the Shanti Swarup Bhatnagar Prize for Science and Technology, one of the highest Indian science awards, in 2000, for his contributions to biological sciences. He is the son of noted scientist Padmabhushan Bhalchandra Udgaonkar.

Biography 

Jayant Udgaonkar, born on 22 March 1960 in the Indian state of Maharashtra, did his graduate studies in chemistry at St. Xavier's College, Mumbai during 1976–79 and secured his master's degree from the Indian Institute of Technology, Chennai in 1981. Moving to Cornell University, he completed his doctoral studies under the guidance of George P. Hess to obtain a PhD for his thesis on acetylcholine receptor in 1986 after which did his post-doctoral studies under Robert Lesh Baldwin at Stanford University during 1986–89. Returning to India, he joined National Centre for Biological Sciences of Tata Institute of Fundamental Research as a reader in 1990 and has been serving as a senior professor since 2007. In between, he held the positions of an associate professor (1995–98), Dean (1997–2008), Head of Administration (1997–2008), Head of Research (1997–2008), Head of Technical Services (1998–2000) and a professor (1998–2007) at the institute and served as an honorary faculty member at the Jawaharlal Nehru Centre for Advanced Scientific Research in 1999. On 1 November 2017, he became the second director of the Indian Institute of Science Education and Research, Pune, succeeding Prof. Krishna N. Ganesh.

Legacy 
During his doctoral studies at Cornell University, Udgaonkar is known to have developed a protocol for rapid chemical kinetic studies at the cell surface. Later, while pursuing his post-doctoral studies, he developed methodologies for hydrogen exchange using Nuclear magnetic resonance spectroscopy for exploring the intermediates populating protein folding pathways. Furthering his Stanford studies on protein folding at NCBS, he propounded the theory that initial hydrophobic collapse is the first stage in protein folding, which he demonstrated using a model protein barstar and elucidated the various transition stages of protein folding and unfolding. He has also demonstrated that, contrary to the general understanding that a single dominant barrier slows down the protein folding, several distributed small barriers can also influence the reaction. His current work focuses on formation of amyloid fibrils and his research has shown multiple pathways of aggregation in the formation of amyloid fibrils of different morphologies.

Udgaonkar has published a number of articles in peer reviewed journals detailing his researches, Google Scholar and ResearchGate, two online repositories of scientific articles, have listed several of them. A former guest editor of the Current Opinion in Structural Biology of Elsevier (2013 and 2015) and a former editorial board member of Folding and Design (1996–98), he is an associate editor of the Biochemistry journal and a member of the editorial board of Protein Engineering, Design and Selection (since 2003), an Oxford journal. He is also a member of the Asia-Pacific International Molecular Biology Network since 2001 and has mentored several scholars in their doctoral researches.

Awards and honors 
Udgaonkar, who stood first in the BSc chemistry examinations of the University of Mumbai in 1979, received several scholarships and research fellowships including the National Merit Scholarship of the Government of India, Merit Scholarship of the Indian Institute of Technology, Madras, Jane Coffin Childs Memorial Fund for Medical Research fellowship, Biotechnology Career Fellowship of Rockefeller Foundation, Golden Jubilee Biotechnology fellowship of the Department of Biotechnology, Swarnajayanti fellowship of the Department of Science and Technology and senior research fellowship of Wellcome Trust and is a J. C. Bose National Fellow of the Department of Science and Technology, the tenancy of the fellowship running from 2007 till 2017. He received the Birla Award in Biology in 1996 and the Indian Academy of Sciences elected him as a fellow in 1997. The Council of Scientific and Industrial Research awarded him the Shanti Swarup Bhatnagar Prize, one of the highest Indian science awards, in 2000. He became an elected fellow of the Indian National Science Academy in 2002 and The World Academy of Sciences elected him as a fellow in 2007.

Selected bibliography

See also 

 Protein folding
 Amyloid
 Barstar
 Acetylcholine receptor

Notes

References

External links 
 

Recipients of the Shanti Swarup Bhatnagar Award in Biological Science
1960 births
Scientists from Maharashtra
Marathi people
St. Xavier's College, Mumbai alumni
University of Mumbai alumni
IIT Madras alumni
Cornell University alumni
Stanford University alumni
Academic staff of the National Centre for Biological Sciences
Academic staff of Tata Institute of Fundamental Research
Indian molecular biologists
Indian biochemists
Indian scientific authors
Fellows of the Indian Academy of Sciences
Fellows of the Indian National Science Academy
TWAS fellows
Council of Scientific and Industrial Research
Living people
20th-century Indian biologists
20th-century Indian chemists
Academic staff of the Indian Institute of Science Education and Research, Pune